Philharmonia insigna is a moth in the family Lecithoceridae. It was described by Chun-Sheng Wu and Kyu-Tek Park in 1999. It is found in Sri Lanka.

References

Moths described in 1999
Philharmonia